Pizzo di Madéi (also known as Pizzo Medaro) is a mountain of the Lepontine Alps, located on the border between Switzerland and Italy. It lies between the valleys of Vergeletto (Ticino), Isorno and Onsernone (Piedmont).

References

External links
 Pizzo di Madéi on Hikr

Lepontine Alps
Mountains of the Alps
Mountains of Switzerland
Mountains of Piedmont
Mountains of Ticino
Italy–Switzerland border
International mountains of Europe